Mother Of Millions is a Greek progressive metal band from Athens, Greece, formed in 2008.

Biography
The band has released three albums, Human (Turkey Vulture Records / Bungalo Records / Universal Music Group Distribution (US)), Sigma (ViciSolum Productions 2017) and Artifacts (ViciSolum Productions 2019), getting the most positive reviews from the audience and the global music press. Orbit (EP, ViciSolum Productions 2022) marked the band's return since the tragic loss of its keyboard player.

The band performed sold-out headline shows in Athens, shows with Textures on their last European tour, support shows with Ruud Jolie’s For All We Know in the Netherlands, while the band has shared the stage with artists such as Pain of Salvation, Devin Townsend Project, Leprous, Oceans of Slumber, Sleepmakeswaves, Septicflesh etc.

In June 2019 during a show promoting Artifacts, Mother of Millions’ keyboardist and beloved friend Makis Tsamkosoglou passed away. Following this tragic incident, the band decided to keep going as a quartet.

Musical style and influences
Mother of Millions are typically categorized in the progressive metal or progressive rock genre. The sound of Mother Of Millions, according to the band, can be described as equally massive as cinematic. Intense experimentation involving elaborate rhythms, folk aesthetics, post-rock elements and progressive rock tunes. The band's members have said they are influenced by different genres, but artists like Pink Floyd, Peter Gabriel, Porcupine Tree, Explosions in the Sky, Tool, Pain of Salvation, etc., and composers like Hans Zimmer, are stated to be major influences to its sound.

Name and logo

The band's name comes from the plant Bryophyllum delagoense also known as 'Mother of Millions'. Bryophyllum delagoense reproduces by seed and by tiny plantlets that are produced at the tips of its fleshy (succulent) leaves. Dislodged leaves and broken leaf parts can also take root and give rise to new plants. This species is commonly spread in garden waste. The tiny seeds are probably wind and water dispersed and its leaves and plantlets may also be dislodged and spread by animals, vehicles, machinery, soil and slashers.

In an interview, the band stated that the plant's toxicity and its uncontrolled reproduction are the two points that stand out as a metaphor regarding nature and society.

The band's logo indicates toxicity and hazard, being an X sign. The logo gives the impression of an heraldic banner demonstrating the band's initials.

Releases

Human (2014)
The band's debut album, Human, was released in February 2014.

Mother of Millions' motto "Rise Evolve" comes from the chorus of the fifth track of the album, "Evolving".

Sigma (2017)

Mother of Millions released their second album Sigma, in November 2017. Sigma was a concept album, focused on silence as a state of inertia. Sigma is the eighteenth letter of the Greek alphabet. It is the initial of the Greek word "Σιωπή", meaning Silence. Sigma is also used as a symbol for the summation operator.

Artifacts (2019)
Their third album, Artifacts, was released on March 22, 2019.

Discography
Human (2014)  -  Turkey Vulture Records / Bungalo Records / Universal Music Group Distribution (US)
Sigma (2017) - ViciSolum Productions (SE)
Artifacts (2019) - ViciSolum Productions (SE)

References

External links
Official website
Vicisolum Productions Record Company
JBM Events Booking & Management

Musical groups established in 2008
Greek progressive rock groups